The Munsee are a subtribe and one of the three divisions of the Lenape. Historically, they lived along the upper portion of the Delaware River, the Minisink, and the adjacent country in New York, New Jersey, and Pennsylvania. They were prominent in the early history of New York and New Jersey, being among the first Indigenous peoples of that region to encounter European colonizers.

Name 
The name is also spelled Minsi, Muncee, or mə́n'si·w. Munsee derives from Minsi, which in turn comes from Min-asin-ink (also Minisink), a placename that translates as "at the place where stones are gathered together."

Territory 
The Munsee originally occupied the headwaters of the Delaware River in present-day New York, New Jersey, and Pennsylvania, extending south to the Lehigh River, and also held the west bank of the Hudson River from the Catskill Mountains nearly to the New Jersey line. They were bordered by the Mohican and Wappinger on the north and east, and fellow Lenape (Delaware) on the south and southeast. They were regarded as a buffer between the southern Lenape and the Iroquois Confederacy based in present-day New York south of the Great Lakes. Their council village was Minisink, probably in Sussex County, New Jersey. The bands along the Hudson were prominent in the early history of New York, but as European-American settlements increased, most of the Munsee moved south to join their relatives along the Delaware.

History

16th and 17th centuries 
In 1669, the Munsee aided the Esopus people in attacking the Dutch colonists, and were defeated by Martin Cregier in the Esopus Wars. By a fraudulent treaty known as the Walking Purchase, the main body of the Munsee was forced to move from the Delaware River about the year 1740. They settled on the Susquehanna River, on lands assigned them by the Haudenosaunee (Iroquois, 'ökwé'ö:weh - "The only true men"). Soon afterward they moved west, joining the main Lenape settlements on the Ohio River. Most became incorporated with that group. In 1756, those remaining in New York were placed upon lands in Schoharie County and were incorporated with the Mohawk.

A considerable body, the Christian Munsee, who were converted by the Moravian missionaries, drew off from the rest and formed a separate organization, most of them moving to Canada during the American Revolution.

18th century 
Some Christian Munsee joined the Ojibwe and Stockbridge people in Wisconsin. The majority joined the rest of the Lenape, with whom they participated in their subsequent wars and removals.

In 1837, Christian Munsees, also called Delaware-Munsies, settled among fellow Lenape in Kansas. In 1859, the Christian Munsees moved to Franklin County, Kansas, and joined a band of Ojibwe people who had migrated south from Michigan. By 1891, the combined community numbered 85, and the US government formed an Indian reservation for them. The reservation was broken into individual land allotments in 1900.

20th and 21st centuries 
The Lenape who kept the name of Munsee were in three bands in the early 20th century in Canada and the United States. Two had consolidated with remnants of other nations so that no separate census is available. These nations were:
 Eelūnaapèewii Lahkèewiit, formerly the Delaware Nation at Moraviantown and Munsee of the Thames, a First Nation headquartered near Thamesville, Ontario 
 Chippewa and Munsee, Franklin County, Kansas
 Stockbridge-Munsee Community at Green Bay Agency, Wisconsin, now a federally recognized tribe

See also
 Muncie, Indiana, location of Ball State University

Notes

References
 
 
 Penford, Saxby Voulaer., "Romantic Suffern - The History of Suffern, New York, from the Earliest Times to the Incorporation of the Village in 1896", Tallman, N.Y., 1955, (1st Edition)

External links

 Eelūnaapèewii Lahkèewiit, Delaware Nation at Moraviantown
 Stockbridge-Munsee Community Band of Mohican Indians

Algonquian ethnonyms
First Nations in Ontario
Indigenous peoples of the Northeastern Woodlands
Lenape
Native American tribes in New Jersey
Native American tribes in New York (state)
Native American tribes in Pennsylvania
Native American tribes in Wisconsin
People of New Netherland